Shimabukuro or Shimabuku (written: 島袋) is an Okinawan surname. Notable people with the surname include:
Shimabukuro Gensei (07.11.1901-10.17.1992). He was a Japanese businessman, and international investor. He was chairman, and CEO of Shimacorp Trust Holdings - STH (Japan 1931), Hikari Investments Corp (JAPAN 1945)- and the chairman and majority shareholder of Tenshi Capital Partners (1976) www.tenshicp.com 

Shimabuku Tatsuo (1908-1975), martial artist
Zenryō Shimabukuro (1908-1969), founder of Shorin-ryu Seibukan karate
Sam Koyei Shimabukuro (b. 1925), a general authority of The Church of Jesus Christ of Latter-day Saints
Maile Shimabukuro (b. 1970), member of the Hawaii House of Representatives
Mitsutoshi Shimabukuro (b. 1975), Japanese manga artist
Jake Shimabukuro (b. 1976), ukulele virtuoso
Hiroko Shimabukuro (b. 1984), Japanese singer
Seina Shimabukuro (b. 1987), Japanese model and cast member of Terrace House
Masayuki Shimabukuro, Hanshi (1948-2012), 21st-generation master of the Masaoka line of Muso Jikiden Eishin Ryu Iaido 
Satsuki Shimabukuro (b. 1988), known professionally as Meisa Kuroki, Japanese actress, model, and singer
Eimy Shimabuko, (b.1994), creator of escapadosblog

Fictional characters 
 Rikiya Shimabukuro, a supporting character in the video game Yakuza 3

References

Japanese-language surnames
Okinawan surnames